Straight ahead is a term used in animation that refers to a method that uses only the first key pose of a character, and then continues drawing the character to create the desired motion. It was first referred to in the 1981 book by Ollie Johnson and Frank Thomas The Illusion of Life, and is a part of the 12 Basic Principles of Animation. It contrasts with its converse, pose to pose animation, in that it does not use inbetweening. Straight ahead action is so named because the animator literally works straight ahead from the first drawing of the scene.  Disney director-animator Woolie Reitherman said, "When i didn't know what I was doing in an action, I always went straight-ahead. I'd just start on ones. Half the time I didn't know what I was doing. To me, it's fun. You find out something you wouldn't have found out otherwise."

Advantages and risks 
Straight ahead animation is mostly used for wild, scrambling actions where spontaneity is important. Because the animator has no real guide to the target destination in the action, a character's form may start to shrink or grow, and the animator will have no idea it happened until after they are done. Although this technique is a lot more spontaneous and creative, it can create inaccurate results.

Advantages 

 The animator gets a natural flow of fluid, spontaneous action.
 It has the vitality of improvisation
 It's very 'creative', the animator goes with the flow, creating all of the action as it comes along
 Often the unconscious mind starts to kick in: like when authors say that their character speaks to them and tells them where it's going.
 It can produce surprises; what animators call "Magic".

Risks 

 Things start to wander.
 Time stretches and the shot gets longer and longer.
 Characters grow and shrink.
 The animator can miss the point of a shot and not arrive at the right place at the right time.
 The director can't see what's happening in the shot, and it's very difficult for more than one animator to work on the scene.

The best way for an animator to make use of the Straight ahead action, is to use it to animate things that have very erratic and unpredictable movement patterns. Fire, water, and fog are some examples of movement that are better animated with the use of the Straight ahead animation technique.

References 

Animation